Gliese 176 b is a super-Earth exoplanet approximately 31 light years away in the constellation of Taurus. This planet orbits very close to its parent red dwarf star Gliese 176 (also called "HD 285968").

The initial announcement confused the planetary periodicity with the stellar periodicity of 40 days, thus giving a 10.24 day period for a 25 Earth-mass planet. Subsequent readings filtered out the star's rotation, giving a more accurate reading of the planet's orbit and minimum mass.

The planet orbits inside the inner magnetosphere of its star. The quoted temperature of 450 K is a "thermal equilibrium" temperature.

It is projected to be dominated by a rocky core, but the true mass is unknown. If the orbit is oriented such that we are viewing it at a nearly face-on angle, the planet may be significantly more massive than the lower limit. If so, it may have attracted a gas envelope like Uranus or Gliese 436 b.

References

External links
 
 

Taurus (constellation)
Exoplanets discovered in 2007
Terrestrial planets
Exoplanets detected by radial velocity
1